Gustavus D. S. Trask (1836 – March 15, 1914) was the governor of Sailors' Snug Harbor. He had three sons: George S. D. Trask; John E. D. Trask; and Benjamin D. Trask. He died on March 15, 1914, in Orange, New Jersey.

References

1836 births
1914 deaths
Sailors' Snug Harbor
People from Staten Island